Juan Funes may refer to:

 Juan Gilberto Funes (1963–1992), Argentine footballer
 Juan Manuel Funes (born 1966), Guatemalan footballer